The 1981–82 Memphis State Tigers men's basketball team represented Memphis State University as a member of the Metro Conference during the 1981–82 NCAA Division I men's basketball season.

The Tigers won Metro Conference regular season and conference tournament titles to receive an automatic bid to the 1982 NCAA tournament. As No. 2 seed in the East region, Memphis State beat No. 7 seed Wake Forest to reach the Sweet Sixteen for the first of three straight seasons. The Villanova Wildcats defeated Memphis State, 70–66, in the regional semifinal. The Tigers finished with a 24–5 record (10–2 Metro), though the NCAA tournament results would later be vacated.

Roster

Schedule and results

|-
!colspan=9 style= | Regular season

|-
!colspan=9 style= | Metro Conference tournament

|-
!colspan=9 style= | NCAA Tournament

Rankings

References

Memphis Tigers men's basketball seasons
1981 in sports in Tennessee
1982 in sports in Tennessee
Memphis State
Memphis State